Pontypool Crane Street railway station served the town of Pontypool in the Welsh county of Monmouthshire.

History
With industry in the South Wales coalfield needing improved transport links the Monmouthshire Railway and Canal Company (MR&CC) opened the first line between Newport to Pontypool in 1852. The line initially terminated at Crane Street Station in Pontypool and was extended to Blaenavon in 1854. A second line, initially run by the LNWR and known locally as the "upper" or "high level" line, was opened in 1879 from just north of Crane St to Blaenavon High Level station and on to Brynmawr. The station was enlarged in 1894.

Crane Street was on the Newport to Blaenavon line which closed for passengers in 1962 (passenger services on the line to Brynmawr had ended in 1941). Part of the station building was used in the creation of a station on the Pontypool and Blaenavon Railway. The site of the station is now occupied by Tesco's car park in Pontypool.

References

External links
Photo at People's Collection Wales

Disused railway stations in Torfaen
Former Great Western Railway stations
Former London and North Western Railway stations
Railway stations in Great Britain opened in 1852
Railway stations in Great Britain closed in 1962
1852 establishments in Wales
Pontypool